Walter Boyer (born September 27, 1937) is a Canadian former professional ice hockey centre.

Career
Wally Boyer was known as a creative playmaker and talented penalty killer throughout his NHL career. Boyer recorded 54 goals and 105 assists for 159 points in 365 career NHL games. A product of the Toronto Maple Leafs' development system, Boyer played his first NHL games with the Leafs during the mid-1960s, before joining the Chicago Blackhawks. At the end of the 1966–67 season, the Hawks captured the Prince of Wales Trophy for finishing first-overall in the six-team standings. When the league expanded to 12 clubs that fall, Boyer became an Oakland Seal, and was later traded to another expansion franchise, the Pittsburgh Penguins.

Awards and achievements 
Memorial Cup Championship (1956)
Calder Cup (AHL) Championship (1965)
Honoured Member of the Manitoba Hockey Hall of Fame

Career statistics

External links

Wally Boyer's biography at Manitoba Hockey Hall of Fame

1937 births
Canadian ice hockey centres
Chicago Blackhawks players
Hershey Bears players
Ice hockey people from Manitoba
Living people
Oakland Seals players
People from Parkland Region, Manitoba
Portland Buckaroos players
Pittsburgh Penguins players
Rochester Americans players
Springfield Indians players
Toronto Maple Leafs players
Toronto Marlboros players
Winnipeg Jets (WHA) players